The National Alliance of Liberals (NAL) was a political party in Ghana during the Second Republic (1969–1972). The party was formed after the ban on party politics was lifted in May 1969 and was dissolved along with all other political parties in Ghana following the coup d'état that replaced the Busia government with the National Redemption Council led by Colonel Acheampong.

Leadership
Komla Agbeli Gbedemah was the founder and leader of the party. Gbedemah however failed to win a seat during the 1969 Ghanaian parliamentary election so Eric Madjitey became the leader within parliament.

Parliamentary elections 
In elections held on 29 August 1969, the NAL won 29 out of 140 seats in the National Assembly.

References

Defunct political parties in Ghana
Political parties established in 1969
Political parties disestablished in 1972
Defunct liberal political parties